Chomérac is a commune in the Ardèche department in southern France.

It is located approximately 10 km away from both the Rhône valley to the east and Privas (capital of the department) to the west.

Geography

History
As a natural pathway from Rhône valley to the Massif Central mountains, Chomérac has been inhabited for a very long time. First settlements records are found in caves and date back from the Middle Paleolithic. There are also evidences for Roman settlements and artefacts in the village (tegulae, villa and Roman road).

Chomérac was severely affected by the French Wars of Religion. In 1621, the village belonged to the catholic Duke of Ventadour. Besieged, it was occupied by the Protestant Monsieur de Blacons on October 14, 1621. Alternately besieged by both parties, the stronghold changed side six times, up until the siege of 1628, when the Catholics decisively took over the village from the Huguenots. This position was beneficial in 1629, during the siege of Privas led by the king Louis XIII and the Cardinal Richelieu.

Population

Economy
Industry started early in Chomérac, thanks to silk manufacturers (up to 15 silk throwing mills in the 19th century) and the marble quarry, which delivers to the whole region and even abroad.

See also
Communes of the Ardèche department

References

Communes of Ardèche